Pavel Shabalin (born 23 October 1988) is a Kazakhstani footballer who plays for Kazakhstan Premier League club FC Taraz as a midfielder.

Career

Club

On 3 July 2019, Shabalin was released by Irtysh Pavlodar, going on to sign for FC Taraz on 24 July 2019, until the end of the 2019 season.

Career statistics

Club

International

Statistics accurate as of match played 15 October 2013

Honours

Aktobe
Kazakhstan Super Cup (1): 2014

References

External links

1988 births
Living people
Kazakhstani footballers
Kazakhstan international footballers
Kazakhstan under-21 international footballers
Kazakhstan Premier League players
FC Irtysh Pavlodar players
FC Aktobe players
FC Okzhetpes players
FC Atyrau players
Association football midfielders
People from Pavlodar Region